Tougaloo may refer to:

 Tougaloo, Mississippi, United States
 Tougaloo College

See also
 Tugaloo, a Cherokee town on the Tugaloo River near present-day Toccoa, Georgia